Women have served in state legislatures in the United States since 1895. Their ranks have increased steadily with the advent of nationwide women's suffrage after 1920 but they remain underrepresented.

History
The first women to serve in any state legislature were Clara Cressingham, Carrie C. Holly and Frances S. Klock, who were all elected in 1894 to the Colorado State House of Representatives. All three were elected the year after women in Colorado obtained the right to vote through popular election in 1893. As Secretary of the House Republican Caucus, Cressingham was the first woman to fill a leadership position in an American legislature. In 1896, Martha Hughes Cannon became the first woman elected to an upper body of a state legislature when she defeated her own husband, Angus M. Cannon, for a seat in the Utah State Senate.

The 50th state to see the debut of female state legislators in their lower house was Hawaii in 1959, who elected Dorothy Devereux and Eureka Forbes to their House of Representatives upon admittance to statehood. Alabama's Senate was the 50th upper house to welcome women when Ann Bedsole and Frances Strong joined the Senate in 1983.

In 2016, the highest shares of female members of a state legislature - at least 35% per state legislature - were in Colorado (30/65 in the House, 12/35 in the Senate), Vermont (65/150 in the House, 9/30 in the Senate), and Arizona (19/60 in the House, 13/30 in the Senate). The shares in Colorado and Vermont decreased to below 40% in 2017, while Arizona, Illinois, Nevada and Washington all saw their numbers increase up to between 35% and 39%. Altogether in 2017, women constitute 24.8% of all state legislators in the United States, a ratio that has increased by less than 4 percentage points since 1994.

Only four chambers have reached a near or absolute majority of women:

New Hampshire Senate (2009-2010, 13/24 women)
Nevada Assembly (2019, 23/42 women)
Colorado House of Representatives(2019, 32/65 women)
Oregon House of Representatives (2020, 30/60 women)

List of first women to serve in state and territorial legislatures

References

External links
 Women's Legislative Network at National Conference of State Legislatures

Women legislators in the United States
State legislators of the United States